The Glyn Valley Tramway was a narrow gauge railway that ran through the Ceiriog Valley in north-east Wales, connecting Chirk with Glyn Ceiriog in Denbighshire (now Wrexham  County Borough). The gauge of the line was  while it was horse-drawn, which was unofficially increased to  when steam locomotives were introduced.

Route

Quarries served

History

The original route

The railway was built to connect the quarries at Glyn Ceriog with the Shropshire Union Canal at Chirk. A standard gauge "Ellesmere & Glyn Valley Railway" was authorised by an Act of 6 August 1866 to run from the Cambrian Railway at Ellesmere to the GWR at Chirk and thence to follow the Glyn Ceiriog road to the quarries. No construction took place and by an Act obtained in 1869, the Ellesmere to Chirk portion was abandoned. A further Act of Parliament, obtained on 10 August 1870, allowed the original company to be dissolved, and the Glyn Valley Tramway to be incorporated to take over the rights, assets and goodwill of the previous company. The company believed it could not raise the £120,000 capital required to build the standard gauge line. Henry Dennis suggested a narrow gauge line instead, which would only require £25,000. The line would run from the canal at Chirk Bank to the Cambrian Slate Quarries.

Rebuilding and extension 

In 1885, additional parliamentary powers were obtained to abandon the Quinta Tramway section between Pontfaen and Chirk Bank, replacing it with a new line from Pontfaen to the Great Western Railway's Chirk station. A two-mile extension was also authorized from Glyn to the quarries around Pandy.

At that time, Henry Dennis was a director and also the tramway's Engineer. He was also the Engineer for the Snailbeach District Railways, near Shrewsbury. When rebuilding of the line began in 1887, Dennis offered to loan the two steam locomotives from Snailbeach, as the carriage of lead ore on that railway had plummetted. Davies suggests that the two locomotives, Belmost and Fernhill, normally worked on relatively straight track, but the Glyn Valley Tramway followed the course of the road, with numerous sharp bends, where the wheel flanges may have distorted the track, opening out the gauge, and this is the most likely reason for the change of gauge. The new line was opened for freight traffic in 1888 and to passengers in 1891. Motive power consisted of steam locomotives purchased from Beyer, Peacock & Company in Manchester.

Operation and closure 

The two original locomotives, Sir Theodore and Dennis were joined by a third Beyer Peacock tram locomotive Glyn in 1892. In 1921, an ex-War Department Light Railways Baldwin Class 10-12-D was purchased; it was regauged by Beyer Peacock from its original  gauge.

After the First World War costs started to rise significantly, while revenues did not. The railway's financial situation declined steadily during the 1920s. The railway needed to carry approximately 45,000 tons of traffic per year to break even. In 1929 it carried 64,857 tons, but by 1932 this had dropped to 21,400 tons. Increased use of road haulage and a change in the ownership of the remaining quarries was the cause of this downturn in traffic.

In 1932, a bus service was started in the valley, for the first time offering passengers a serious competition to travelling on the tramway. Passenger receipts declined steeply that year, and passenger services were abandoned at the beginning of 1933. Freight traffic continued to decline and the losses to mount on the railway and all services ceased in July 1935 as the company went into voluntary liquidation. In 1936 the track was removed and all the locomotives were scrapped.

Preservation 

Most of the railway's stock and track were scrapped in the 1930s. However, some carriage bodies were sold to local farmers. Two of these bodies survived long enough to be rescued by the Talyllyn Railway where they have been restored to working order and are now used in regular traffic. A quantity of Glyn Valley track also found its way to the Talyllyn.

The waiting rooms in Pontfadog and Dolywern survive in their original locations. In 1950 the council officer used Pontfadog waiting room to collect rates and the locals nicknamed it ‘Pontfadog Town Hall’. It was later bought by the public house and it was also used as a craft shop.

Glyn Valley Tramway Trust 
In October 2007, the Glyn Valley Tramway Trust was formed with the aim of restoring part of the tramway. They plan to recreate its appearance in the 1920s era and provide a visitor centre and workshops with educational facilities to display and interpret the history and development of the Tramway through artefacts and audio-visual media. The Glyn Valley Tramway Trust are to carry out a Design and Evaluation study of the entire route from Chirk to Glyn Ceiriog and beyond, and as a first phase intends to re-instate a  section as an operational steam heritage railway from the original Chirk GVT station to Baddy's Wood near Pontfaen.

In 2019, the Glyn Valley Tramway Trust started to clear trees and spoil from the station site at Chirk, adjacent to the Network Rail station. In August 2022, the platform and trackbed had been cleared. The Trust intends to rebuild the platform, and lay track in the station area.

The first section of track was laid at Chirk station in December 2022.

New Glyn Valley Tramway & Industrial Heritage Trust 
The New Glyn Valley Tramway & Industrial Heritage Trust, formed in 1985, has opened a Heritage and Interpretation Centre in Glyn Ceiriog.

Locomotives

See also 
British narrow gauge railways
Tram engine

References

Bibliography

External links 

 Glyn Valley Tramway Online
 New Glyn Valley Tramway & Industrial Heritage Trust (formerly Glyn Valley Tramway Group

Transport in Wrexham County Borough
2 ft 4½ in gauge railways in Wales
Closed railway lines in Wales
Railway companies established in 1870
Railway lines opened in 1873
Railway companies disestablished in 1935
Railway lines closed in 1935
Horse-drawn railways